= Geology of the Bay of Biscay =

The geology of the Bay of Biscay formed as the North Atlantic opened during the late Cretaceous. Near shore, thinned continental crust shows signs of complicated stress patterns, while basalt oceanic crust lies beneath deep water offshore. Geologists have debated whether the bay opened in a simple rotation "scissor pattern" or through left-lateral strike slip faulting.

== Structural geology ==
Much of the geologic structure of the Bay of Biscay is interpreted from seismic profiles. A series of analyses published between 1987 and 1990 found thin layers of Mesozoic and Cenozoic sediments and the Moho around 33 kilometers deep. Different reflections suggested possible thrust sheets related to the Variscan orogeny and signs of foreland deformation down into the mantle.

North of La Rochelle the seismic reflection became scattered, marking north-dipping features related to South-Armorican south-vergent thrusts.

The Basque-Cantabrian Basin is a large sedimentary basin on thinned continental crust that lies onshore and offshore along the southern margin of the Bay of Biscay on the north coast of Spain. Rifting broke up Jurassic carbonate "ramps," leading to the erosion of some of these carbonate units. When the basin first formed, it was partly separated from the neighboring Pyrenean basin by the Landes high-ground, although this feature later got underthrusted and buried by Cretaceous sediments offshore.

The faulted offshore Biscay synclinorium is believed to be an extension of the onshore Pyrenean fault zone, by way of the Leiza fault. This structural feature was buried by deep-sea volcanic eruptions during the Aptian.

== Oil and natural gas ==
The Bay of Biscay is a potential target area for deep water oil and gas drilling. Spectrum reinterpreted old seismic data in the region between 2014 and 2015, which was included in its "Atlantic Deep" dataset with a focus on sedimentary layers in Jurassic rifts.
